FD2 most often refers to Final Destination 2, a 2003 American horror film.

FD2 may also refer to:

 FD2 (car)
 Fairey Delta 2, an experimental aircraft
 Alex Caulder, a fictional character